KDAG (96.9 FM) is a radio station broadcasting a mainstream rock music format. Licensed to Farmington, New Mexico, United States, the station is owned by iHeartMedia, Inc. and features programming from Premiere Networks and Westwood One.

Translators
KDAG programming is also carried on two broadcast translator stations to extend or improve the coverage area of the station.

References

External links

DAG
Mainstream rock radio stations in the United States
Radio stations established in 1975
IHeartMedia radio stations